"No One Is to Blame" is a song by British musician Howard Jones. The song, in its original version, can be found on his second studio album, Dream into Action, which was released in 1985. Following the success of the previous singles taken from the album, the original track for "No One Is to Blame" was re-recorded to give the song a more radio-friendly sound. Phil Collins and Hugh Padgham produced the re-recording, with Collins adding his own drum work and mood. This new version of the song was included on the 1986 US EP Action Replay as well as the CD version of Jones' 1986 studio album, One to One.

"No One Is to Blame" was released as a single in March 1986 and became Jones' biggest hit in the United States, peaking at #4 on the Billboard Hot 100. The song also became the first of his two #1 songs on the U.S. adult contemporary chart ("Everlasting Love" would top this chart in 1989). The song was also a top 10 hit in Australia and a #16 hit in the U.K.

Track list

7"
“No One Is to Blame” – 4:14
“The Chase” – 2:53

12”
“No One Is to Blame (Extended Mix)” – 5:16
“The Chase” – 2:53
“No One Is to Blame (The Long Mix)” – 3:07

Chart positions

Weekly Charts

Year end charts

Personnel
Howard Jones – vocals, keyboards, percussion programming
Phil Collins – drums, backing vocals & co-producer
Phil Palmer – guitar
Mo Foster – bass guitar
Afrodiziak – backing vocals
Hugh Padgham – co-producer & engineer
Steve Chase & Paul Gomersall – assistant engineers

Other versions
Jones performed the song solo on The Old Grey Whistle Test in 1985.
A previously unreleased version of "No One is to Blame" by Neilson Hubbard appears on the 2001 Parasol Records compilation, Parasol's Sweet Sixteen, Volume 4..
Katrina Carlson recorded a cover in 2007 that featured vocals from Jones.

See also 
 List of number-one adult contemporary singles of 1986 (U.S.)

References

External links
 [ Billboard.com for US artist chart history]
 OfficialCharts.com for UK artist chart history
 Here And Now at cdbaby.com
 Katrina Carlson at Billboard.com

1985 songs
1986 singles
1980s ballads
New wave ballads
Howard Jones (English musician) songs
British soft rock songs
Songs written by Howard Jones (English musician)
Song recordings produced by Hugh Padgham
Song recordings produced by Phil Collins
Elektra Records singles
Warner Music Group singles